Western Samoa competed at the 1988 Summer Olympics in Seoul, South Korea.

Competitors
The following is the list of number of competitors in the Games.

Athletics

Men

Field events

Boxing

Weightlifting

Men

Wrestling

Men's Freestyle

References

Official Olympic Reports

Nations at the 1988 Summer Olympics
1988
1988 in Samoa